Sadowie may refer to the following places:
Sadowie, Greater Poland Voivodeship (west-central Poland)
Sadowie, Lesser Poland Voivodeship (south Poland)
Sadowie, Świętokrzyskie Voivodeship (south-central Poland)
Sadowie, Będzin County in Silesian Voivodeship (south Poland)
Sadowie, Zawiercie County in Silesian Voivodeship (south Poland)